Navafría is a municipality located in the province of Segovia, Castile and León, Spain. According to the 2008 census (INE), the municipality has a population of 370 inhabitants.

References

Municipalities in the Province of Segovia